Vera Sarah Bushfield (née Cahalan, August 9, 1889April 16, 1976) was an American politician served as a U.S. senator from South Dakota in 1948, as well as the First Lady of South Dakota from 1939 to 1943. Bushfield's appointment also marked the first time one state had been represented by two female senators; Gladys Pyle served for two months in late 1938 and early 1939.

Early life
Vera Sarah Cahalan was born in Miller, South Dakota on August 9, 1889, the daughter of Maurice Francis Cahalan and Mary Ellen (Conners) Cahalan. She attended the public schools of Miller and in 1912 she graduated from Menomonie, Wisconsin's Stout Institute with a degree in domestic science. In addition, Cahalan attended Dakota Wesleyan University and the University of Minnesota.

On April 15, 1912, Cahalan married Harlan J. Bushfield, who was also a resident of Miller, and the Bushfields continued to reside there. The Bushfields were the parents of three children; Mary, John, and Harlan Jr.

First lady of South Dakota
Harlan Bushfield was an attorney and Republican Party official who served as Governor of South Dakota from 1939 to 1943.

After serving as governor, Harlan Bushfield served as a U.S. Senator beginning in 1943. Because of illness, he was not running for reelection in 1948, and he died in September. The contest to succeed him was between Republican Karl E. Mundt and Democrat John A. Engel.

U.S. Senator
On October 6, 1948, Vera Bushfield was appointed to the Senate to temporarily fill the vacancy caused by her husband's death. Governor George T. Mickelson appointed her with the understanding that she would resign before the end of the term. During her tenure, the Senate was not in session, so Bushfield chose to remain in Pierre with a small staff and attend to constituent services rather than travel to Washington, D.C.

Mundt won the November election, and Bushfield resigned on December 26, 1948. Her resignation enabled Mickelson to appoint Mundt, giving him a few days of seniority over other senators elected in 1948, whose terms began in January 1949.

Later life
Bushfield maintained an interest in politics. In 1952, she endorsed Senator Robert A. Taft for president. Taft lost the Republican nomination to Dwight Eisenhower, who went on to win the general election.

In 1961, Bushfield took advantage of the floor privileges granted to former senators to speak to the U.S. Senate on the 100th anniversary of the creation of Dakota Territory. After a speech by James Eastland in which he praised the career of Harlan Bushfield, Eastland yielded the floor to Senator Francis H. Case, who introduced Vera Bushfield so she could deliver her remarks.

Vera Bushfield died in Fort Collins, Colorado on April 16, 1976. She is buried at the G.A.R. Cemetery in Miller.

See also
Women in the United States Senate

References

External links

1889 births
1976 deaths
Dakota Wesleyan University alumni
Female United States senators
First Ladies and Gentlemen of South Dakota
People from Miller, South Dakota
Republican Party United States senators from South Dakota
South Dakota Republicans
Spouses of South Dakota politicians
University of Minnesota alumni
University of Wisconsin–Stout alumni
Women in South Dakota politics
20th-century American politicians
20th-century American women politicians
Old Right (United States)